The  is a major rapid transit system in Tokyo, Japan, operated by the Tokyo Metro Co. With an average daily ridership of 6.84 million passengers, the Tokyo Metro is the larger of the two subway operators in the city; the other being the Toei Subway, with 2.85 million average daily rides.

Organization

TRTA was administered by the Ministry of Land, Infrastructure and Transport, and jointly funded by the national and metropolitan governments. It was formed in 1941 as a part-nationalization of the Tokyo Underground Railway and Tokyo Rapid Railway (now both form the Tokyo Metro Ginza Line), although its oldest lines date back to 1927 with the opening of the Tokyo Underground Railway the same year. Private sector investments to the TRTA were prohibited in 1951 when it was converted into an ordinary statutory corporation.

The other major subway operator is Tokyo Metropolitan Bureau of Transportation (Toei Subway) which is owned solely by the government of Tokyo. Tokyo Metro and Toei trains form completely separate networks, although Tokyo Metro Namboku Line and Toei Mita Line share the same track between Meguro Station and Shirokane-takanawa Station. Prepaid rail passes can freely interchange between the two networks (as well as other rail companies in the area), but fares are assessed separately for legs on each of these systems and regular ticket holders must purchase a second ticket, or a special transfer ticket, to change from a Toei line to a Tokyo Metro line and vice versa. Though, most Tokyo Metro (and Toei) line offer through service to lines outside of central Tokyo run by other carriers, and this can somewhat complicate the ticketing.

Much effort has been made to make the system accessible to non-Japanese speaking users:

 Many train stops are announced in both English and Japanese. Announcements also provide connecting line information.
 Ticket machines can switch between English and Japanese user interfaces.
 Train stations are signposted in English and Japanese (in kanji and hiragana). There are also numerous signs in Chinese (in simplified characters) and Korean.
 Train stations are now also consecutively numbered on each color-coded line, allowing even non-English speakers to be able to commute without necessarily knowing the name of the station. For example, Shinjuku Station on the Marunouchi Line is also signposted as M-08 with a red colored circle surrounding it; even if a commuter could not read the English or Japanese station names on signs or maps, they could simply look for the red line and then find the appropriately numbered station on said line. In addition, some trains have interior LCD displays which display station names in Japanese, English, Chinese, and Korean.

Many stations are also designed to help blind people as railings often have Braille at their base, and raised yellow rubber guide strips are used on flooring throughout the network.

Tokyo Metro stations began accepting contactless (RFID) Pasmo stored value cards in March 2007 to pay fares, and the JR East Suica system is also universally accepted. Both these passes also can be used on surrounding rail systems throughout the area and many rail lines in other areas of Japan. Due to the complexity of the fare systems in Japan, most riders converted to these cards very quickly even though there is an additional charge to issue it.

The Tokyo Metro is extremely punctual and has regular trains arriving 3 to 6 minutes apart most of the day and night. However, it does not run 24 hours a day. While through service with other companies complicates this somewhat, the last train generally starts at midnight and completes its service by 00:45, and the first train generally starts at 05:00.

Tokyo Metro indicated in its public share offering that it would cease line construction once the Fukutoshin Line was completed. That line was completed in March 2013 with the opening of the connection with the Tōkyū Tōyoko Line at Shibuya Station, allowing through service as far as Motomachi-Chūkagai Station in Yokohama. There are several lines such as the Hanzōmon Line that still have extensions in their official plans, and in the past, these plans have tended to happen, though often over several decades.

There are also some other rail project proposals in Tokyo which would involve large-scale tunneling projects, but these are unlikely to involve Tokyo Metro. The only proposal that has any suggestion of possible Tokyo Metro involvement is the prominent project proposed as a new Narita and Haneda Airport connection through a tunnel through central Tokyo to a new station adjacent to the existing Tokyo Station. This line is often described as a bypass of the current Toei Asakusa Line. It would link the Keisei Oshiage Line (with service to Narita Airport) to the Keikyu Main Line (with service to Haneda Airport) through Tokyo Station. The 400 billion yen project would be largely divided between the Tokyo metropolitan government and the Japanese central government (which is similar to the structure of Tokyo Metro) with the rail operator or operators paying the balance. The suggestion of Tokyo Metro involvement comes mostly from its description as a bypass to the Asakusa Line which might imply it to be a subway line, but the principle proposal only includes one stop in Tokyo (at Tokyo Station). The principle justification of the proposal is to reduce connection time from Narita Airport to Tokyo Station by 13 minutes, and the design of the proposal makes this much more a high-speed rail project than a subway project (though, it would likely not be up to all of Japan's Shinkansen high-speed rail standards). Currently the only high-speed connection to the Narita Airport is the Keisei Skyliner which runs to Ueno, but there is ordinary train service between these airports using the Asakusa Line. The proposal would essentially allow the Skyliner to run to the more important Tokyo Station as well as establish a high-speed connection to the Haneda Airport.

Tokyo Metro also owns a number of commercial developments which mostly consist of shopping developments at major stations. It also owns the Subway Museum near Kasai Station on the Tokyo Metro Tōzai Line which opened on July 12, 1986, and features a few retired trains which once operated on the Ginza and Marunouchi Lines as well as a maintenance vehicle.

In 2017, Tokyo Metro opened its affiliate in Hanoi, Vietnam, which is set to be the service operator of Hanoi Metro.

Fares
Pasmo and Suica are accepted on the Tokyo Metro, as well as on railway stations operated by other companies. Transfers between Tokyo Metro subway lines and Toei Subway lines are usually not free, but a discount is given when using the Pasmo or Suica cards to transfer between lines.

Traffic
According to the company, an average of 6.33 million people used the company's nine subway routes each day in 2009. The company made a profit of ¥63.5 billion in 2009.

Lines

List of Tokyo Metro lines

Note: Line numbers are for internal usage only and not listed on subway maps.
Note: Excluding the  stretch between Wakoshi and Kotake-mukaihara shared with Yurakucho Line.

Through services to other lines

 Some of the Tōkyū Tōyoko Line express trains, instead of continuing towards Yokohama/Motomachi-Chūkagai, change course at Hiyoshi for Tōkyū Shin-Yokohama Line and share all of the through services downstream just as Tōkyū Meguro Line.

Stations

There are a total of 180 unique stations (i.e., counting stations served by multiple lines only once) on the Tokyo Metro network. Most stations are located within the 23 special wards and fall inside the Yamanote Line rail loop — some wards such as Setagaya and Ōta have no stations (or only a limited number of stations), as rail service in these areas has historically been provided by the Toei Subway or any of the various .

Major interchange stations, connecting three or more Tokyo Metro lines, include the following:
 
 
 
 
  / 
  / 
 
 
 

Other major stations provide additional connections to other railway operators such as the Toei Subway, JR East, and the various private railways, including (but not limited to) the following:

Depots

Rolling stock 

, Tokyo Metro operates a fleet of 2,728 electric multiple unit (EMU) vehicles, the largest fleet for a private railway operator in Japan.

600 V third rail / 1,435 mm gauge lines 

 02 series – Marunouchi Line
 1000 series – Ginza Line
 2000 series - Marunouchi Line

1,500 V overhead / 1,067 mm gauge lines 

 05 series – Tōzai Line
 07 series – Tōzai Line
 08 series – Hanzōmon Line
 8000 series – Hanzōmon Line
 9000 series – Namboku Line
 10000 series – Yūrakuchō Line, Fukutoshin Line
 13000 series – Hibiya Line
 15000 series – Tōzai Line
 16000 series – Chiyoda Line
 17000 series – Yūrakuchō Line, Fukutoshin Line
 18000 series – Hanzōmon Line

Trains from other operators are also used on Tokyo Metro lines as a consequence of inter-running services.

Overcrowding

As is common with rail transport in Tokyo, Tokyo Metro trains are severely crowded during peak periods. During the morning peak period, platform attendants (oshiya) are sometimes needed to push riders and their belongings into train cars so that the doors can close. On some Tokyo Metro lines, the first or last car of a train is reserved for women during peak hours.

Network map

See also

 List of Tokyo Metro stations
 List of urban rail systems in Japan
 List of metro systems

References

External links

 Tokyo Metro 
 Tokyo Metro Subway Map (PDF)

 
Rail transport in Tokyo
Transport companies based in Tokyo
Underground rapid transit in Japan
Government-owned companies based in Tokyo
1927 establishments in Japan
Railway lines opened in 1927